Bellthorpe is a rural locality in the Moreton Bay Region, Queensland, Australia.

Much of the area is protected within the Bellthorpe National Park.

Geography 
The south of Bellthorpe lies within the Stanley River catchment.  In the north Kilcoy Creek flows into the Mary River.

Bellthorpe West is a neighbourhood in the north-west of the locality.

History 
The locality was possibly named after politician Joshua Thomas Bell who was the Secretary for Public Lands in the Queensland Government at the time the district became available for selection.

Bellthorpe Provisional School opened on 22 April 1919, closing in 1922 due to low student numbers. However, it re-opened in 1923 and became Bellthorpe State School in 1927. It closed in 1969.

Bellthorpe West Provisional School opened on 21 March 1955, becoming Bellthorpe West State School in 1959. It also closed in 1969.

References 

Suburbs of Moreton Bay Region
Localities in Queensland